Drimiopsis is a genus of African bulbous perennial herbs in the family Asparagaceae, subfamily Scilloideae, native to sub-Saharan Africa. Sometimes species are placed under the genus Ledebouria.

Species
 Drimiopsis atropurpurea N.E.Br - Gauteng, KwaZulu-Natal
 Drimiopsis barteri Baker  - from Ghana to Somalia, south to Zambia
 Drimiopsis botryoides Baker - eastern Africa
 Drimiopsis burkei Baker - Gauteng, KwaZulu-Natal, Zimbabwe
 Drimiopsis comptonii U.Müll.-Doblies & D.Müll.-Doblies - Eswatini
 Drimiopsis davidsoniae U.Müll.-Doblies & D.Müll.-Doblies - Mpumalanga
 Drimiopsis fischeri (Engl.) Stedje - Tanzania
 Drimiopsis linioseta Hankey & Lebatha - Mpumalanga
 Drimiopsis maculata (type)
 Drimiopsis pusilla U.Müll.-Doblies & D.Müll.-Doblies - Eswatini
 Drimiopsis reilleyana U.Müll.-Doblies & D.Müll.-Doblies - Eswatini
 Drimiopsis rosea A.Chev. - Central African Republic
 Drimiopsis seretii De Wild - Zaïre
 Drimiopsis spicata (Baker) Sebsebe & Stedje in I.Friis & H.Balslev - Sudan, Ethiopia

References

External links 

 Drimiopsis info at the pacific bulb society .
 Desert-tropicals genus page .
 Yuccado nursery page  .

Scilloideae
Flora of Africa
Asparagaceae genera